Bergeheii is a mountain in the municipality of Valle in Agder county, Norway. The lake Rosskreppfjorden lies to the south of the mountain and the lake Botnsvatnet lies to the southeast of the mountain.

See also
List of mountains of Norway

References

Mountains of Agder
Valle, Norway